The men's team sabre was one of eight fencing events on the fencing at the 1972 Summer Olympics programme. It was the fourteenth appearance of the event. The competition was held from September 3 to 4, 1972. 63 fencers from 13 nations competed.

Rosters

Results

Round 1

Round 1 Pool A 

Romania and Hungary each defeated Bulgaria, 11–5 and 12–4, respectively. The two victors then faced off. Hungary won 9–3.

Round 1 Pool B 

Cuba and France each defeated the United States, 9–7 and 11–5, respectively. The two victors then faced off. France won 9–5.

Round 1 Pool C 

The Soviet Union and Italy each defeated Great Britain, 10–6 and 13–3, respectively. The two victors then faced off. The Soviet Union won 9–7.

Round 1 Pool D 

In the first set of matches, West Germany defeated Switzerland and Poland prevailed over Austria, both 12–4. In the second, West Germany and Austria drew 8–8 (with 57 touches apiece) and Poland won over Switzerland 12–4. In the third round, Poland defeated West Germany 11–5 to secure first place while Austria and Switzerland drew at 8–8 (61 touches apiece), keeping Austria in third place and allowing West Germany to advance in second.

Elimination rounds 

The final was a rematch of the preliminary round match between the Soviet Union (which had won) and Italy. In this second meeting, Italy won the gold medal by defeating the Soviets 9–5.

References

Fencing at the 1972 Summer Olympics
Men's events at the 1972 Summer Olympics